Expired (alternatively titled Loveland in other countries) is a 2022 Australian independent science fiction film directed by Ivan Sen and starring Ryan Kwanten, Hugo Weaving and Jillian Nguyen.

Cast 
 Ryan Kwanten as Jack
 Hugo Weaving as Dr. Bergman
 Tim Lo
 Jillian Nguyen as April
 David Field as Sam
 Matour Franck
 Andrew Ng

Release
It was released theatrically on 18 March 2022. It also became available for online rental on the same day in the United States.

References

External links 
 
 

2022 science fiction films
Films directed by Ivan Sen
2020s English-language films
2020s Australian films